Malcolm Tod (16 March 1897 – 1 July 1968) was a British actor. He appeared in more than thirty films from 1921 to 1934.

Selected filmography

References

External links 

1897 births
Year of death unknown
English male film actors
English male silent film actors
20th-century English male actors
People from Burton upon Trent
1968 deaths